For commune in Romania see Supur

Supur is a village under Raipur-Supur gram panchayat in Bolpur Sriniketan CD block in Bolpur subdivision of Birbhum district, West Bengal, India.

History
As per mythology, in ancient times, Supur was the capital of Raja Surath. Some 150 years ago or a little earlier, Supur and Surul were better known places than Bolpur, then a small village, and Shantiniketan did not exist.

Geography

Location

Demographics
As per the 2011 Census of India, Supur had a total population of 1,803 of which 910 (50%) were males and 893 (50%) were females. Population below 6 years was 220. The total number of literates in Supur was 1,096 (69.24% of the population over 6 years).

Transport
Supur is on National Highway 114.

Culture
As seen in the photograph (alongside) there are two Shiva temples at Supur, referred to as twin Shiva temples. David J. McCutchion mentions that one of them is a 19th century ridged rekha deul, with rich terracotta decoration on all sides. The other one is a rekha deul with ridged turrets.

Healthcare
There is a primary health centre at Supur (with 10 beds).

References

Villages in Birbhum district